Alexander A. Balandin is an electrical engineer, solid-state physicist, and materials scientist best known for the experimental discovery of unique thermal properties of graphene and their theoretical explanation; studies of phonons in nanostructures and low-dimensional materials, which led to the development of the field of phonon engineering; investigation of low-frequency electronic noise in materials and devices; and demonstration of the first charge-density-wave quantum devices operating
at room temperature.

Academic career
Alexander A. Balandin received his BS and MS degrees Summa Cum Laude in applied mathematics and applied physics from the Moscow Institute of Physics and Technology (MIPT), Russia. He received his second MS degree and Ph.D. degree in electrical engineering from the University of Notre Dame, U.S. After completion of his postdoctoral studies at the Department of Electrical Engineering of the University of California, Los Angeles (UCLA), he joined the University of California, Riverside (UCR) as a faculty member. He is presently a Distinguished Professor of Electrical and Computer Engineering and the University of California Presidential Chair Professor of Materials Science. He has served as the Founding Chair of the campus-wide Materials Science and Engineering (MS&E) Program and as a Director of the Nanofabrication Facility (NanoFab) at UCR. Presently, he serves as a Director of the UCR's Phonon Optimized Engineered Materials (POEM) Center. Professor Balandin is a Deputy Editor-in-Chief for Applied Physics Letters (APL).

Research
Professor Balandin's research expertise covers a wide range of nanotechnology, materials science, electronics, phononics and spintronics fields with particular focus on low-dimensional materials and devices. He conducts both experimental and theoretical research. He is recognized as a pioneer of the graphene thermal field and one of the pioneers of the phononics field. His research interests include charge density wave effects in low-dimensional materials and their device applications, electronic noise in materials and devices, Brillouin – Mandelstam and Raman spectroscopy of various materials, practical applications of graphene in thermal management and energy conversion. He is also active in the areas of emerging devices and alternative computational paradigms. 
 
Professor Balandin was among the pioneers of the field of phononics and phonon engineering. In 1998, Balandin published an influential paper on the effects of phonon spatial confinement on thermal conductivity of nanostructures, where the term “phonon engineering” appeared for the first time in a journal publication. In this work, he proposed theoretically a new physical mechanism for reduction of thermal conductivity due to the changes in the phonon group velocity and density of states induced by spatial confinement. The theoretically predicted changes in the acoustic phonon spectrum in individual nanostructures were later confirmed experimentally. Phonon engineering has applications in electronics, thermal management, and thermoelectric energy conversion.

In 2008, Professor Balandin conducted pioneering research of thermal conductivity of graphene. In order to perform the first measurement of thermal properties of graphene, Balandin invented a new optothermal experiment technique based on Raman spectroscopy. He and his coworkers explained theoretically why the intrinsic thermal conductivity of graphene can be higher than that of bulk graphite, and demonstrated experimentally the evolution of heat conduction when the system dimensionality changes from 2D (graphene) to 3D (graphite). The Balandin optothermal technique for measuring the thermal conductivity was adopted by many laboratories worldwide, and extended, with various modifications and improvements, to a range of other 2D materials. Balandin's contributions to graphene field go beyond graphene thermal properties and thermal management applications. His research group conducted detailed studies of low-frequency electronic noise in graphene devices; demonstrated graphene selective sensors, which do not rely on surface functionalization; and graphene logic gates and circuits, which do not require electronic band-gap in graphene.

Professor Balandin made a number of important contributions to the field of low-frequency electronic noise, also known as 1/f noise. His early work in the 1/f noise field included investigation of noise sources in GaN materials and devices, which led to a substantial reduction in the noise level in such type of devices made of wide band-gap semiconductors. In 2008, he started the investigation of electronic noise in graphene and other 2D materials. The main results of his research included understanding the mechanism of the 1/f noise in graphene, which is different from that in conventional semiconductors or metals; the use of few-layer graphene to address the century-old problem of surface vs. volume noise origin; understanding unusual effects of irradiation on noise in graphene, which revealed a possibility of noise reduction in graphene after irradiation. He successfully used noise measurements as spectroscopy for better understanding of the specifics of electron transport in graphene and other low-dimensional (1D and 2D) materials.

Professor Balandin's work helped in the rebirth of the charge density wave (CDW) research field. The early work on CDW effects was performed with bulk samples, which have quasi-1D crystal structures of strongly-bound 1D atomic chains that are weakly bound together by van der Waals forces. The rebirth of the CDW field has been associated, from one side, with the interest in layered quasi-2D van der Waals materials and, from another side, with the realization that some of these materials reveal CDW effects at room temperature and above. Balandin group demonstrated the first CDW device operating at room temperature. Balandin and co-workers used original low-frequency noise spectroscopy to monitor phase transitions in 2D CDW quantum materials, demonstrated the extreme radiation hardness of CDW devices  and proposed a number of transistor-less logic circuits implemented with CDW devices.

Honors and awards
Balandin received the following honors and awards:
The Vannevar Bush Faculty Fellowship (VBFF), 2021  
The Brillouin Medal – International Phononics Society (IPS), 2019 “For discovery of unique phonon properties of graphene, and contributions to the development of graphene thermal management applications.” 
Clarivate Analytics and Thomson Reuters Highly Cited Researcher, since 2015
Fellow of MRS – The Materials Research Society, 2014
The MRS Medal – The Materials Research Society, 2013 “For discovery of the extraordinary high intrinsic thermal conductivity of graphene, development of an original optothermal measurement technique for investigation of thermal properties of graphene, and theoretical explanation of the unique features of the phonon transport in graphene” 
Fellow of IEEE – The Institute of Electrical and Electronics Engineering, 2013
Fellow of APS – The American Physical Society, 2012
The Pioneer of Nanotechnology Award – IEEE, 2011 “For pioneering contributions to nanoscale phonon transport with applications in nanodevices, graphene devices, thermoelectric and thermal management of advanced electronics.”
Fellow of SPIE - The International Society for Optical Engineering, 2011
Fellow of OSA - The Optical Society of America, 2011 
Fellow of AAAS - The American Association for Advancement of Science, 2007  
Office of Naval Research (ONR) Young Investigator Award, Arlington, U.S., 2002
National Science Foundation (NSF) Faculty CAREER Award, 2001
Civil Research and Development Foundation (CRDF) Award, Arlington, U.S., 1999
Merrill Lynch Innovative Engineering Research Award, WTC, New York, U.S., 1998 “For practically important engineering dissertation research”

Research Group

Balandin group's expertise covers a broad range of topics from solid-state physics to experimental investigation of advanced materials and devices with applications in electronics and energy conversion. The synergy among different research directions is in the focus on spatial confinement-induced effects in advanced materials, phonons and strongly correlated phenomena such as charge-density waves. The main research activities include Raman and Brillouin – Mandelstam light scattering spectroscopy; nanofabrication and testing of electronic devices with 2D and 1D materials; low-frequency electronic noise spectroscopy; thermal and electrical characterization of materials.

References

External links

Balandin Group at UC Riverside
Balandin CV at UC Riverside

20th-century births
Living people
American electrical engineers
Russian electrical engineers
UCLA Henry Samueli School of Engineering and Applied Science alumni
Notre Dame College of Engineering alumni
University of California, Riverside faculty
Fellow Members of the IEEE
Fellows of the American Association for the Advancement of Science
Fellows of the American Physical Society
Fellows of SPIE
Scientists from California
Year of birth missing (living people)
Moscow Institute of Physics and Technology alumni